Heilongjiang Crane City Football Club is an amateur Chinese football club. The team is based in Qiqihar, Heilongjiang. They played at the 15,000-capacity Hecheng Stadium in Qiqihar.

History
Qiqihaer Northern Wolf Football Club was established in 2008. In 2013, it was taken over and renamed Qiqihaer Zhongjian Bituminous Concrete F.C.

In 2017, they participated in the 2017 China Amateur Football League, and achieved 3rd place---a place eligible for promotion to China League Two, after beating Zhaoqing Hengtai by a total score of 3-2. The club then changed its name to Qiqihaer Hecheng Yiyang F.C. However, they were eventually denied promotion.

Before the 2018 Chinese Champions League season, they changed their name once again, to Heilongjiang Crane City F.C. on 24 April 2018. In the round of 16 knock-out stage, they were eliminated by the eventual champions, Taizhou Yuanda, and was ranked 12th. Although eligible for promotion due to vacancies created by multiple teams failing to register for 2019 China League Two, they announced their withdrawal from all Chinese football leagues in January 2019, and dissolved soon after.

Name history
2008–2013 Qiqihaer Northern Wolf F.C. 齐齐哈尔北狼
2013–2017  Qiqihaer Zhongjian Bituminous Concrete F.C. 齐齐哈尔中建商砼
2017–2018  Qiqihaer Hecheng Yiyang F.C. 齐齐哈尔鹤城翼阳
2018–2019 Heilongjiang Crane City F.C. 黑龙江齐鹤大地

Results
All-time league rankings

As of the end of 2018 season.

 in North Group.

Key
 Pld = Played
 W = Games won
 D = Games drawn
 L = Games lost
 F = Goals for
 A = Goals against
 Pts = Points
 Pos = Final position

 DNQ = Did not qualify
 DNE = Did not enter
 NH = Not Held
 WD = Withdrawal
 – = Does Not Exist
 R1 = Round 1
 R2 = Round 2
 R3 = Round 3
 R4 = Round 4

 F = Final
 SF = Semi-finals
 QF = Quarter-finals
 R16 = Round of 16
 Group = Group stage
 GS2 = Second Group stage
 QR1 = First Qualifying Round
 QR2 = Second Qualifying Round
 QR3 = Third Qualifying Round

References

Football clubs in China
Sport in Heilongjiang
Qiqihar